Dedeler is a village in the Yüksekova District of Hakkâri Province in Turkey. The village is populated by Kurds of the Dirî tribe and had a population of 880 in 2022.

History
Zīzan (today called Dedeler) was inhabited by 21 Assyrian families in 1850, all of whom were adherents of the Church of the East and were served by one priest and one church as part of the diocese of Gāwār according to the English missionary George Percy Badger. The population had increased to 30 families by 1877 when visited by Edward Lewes Cutts. The village was destroyed by the Ottoman Army in 1915 amidst the Sayfo.

Population 
Population history from 2000 to 2022:

References
Notes

Citations

Bibliography

Villages in Yüksekova District
Kurdish settlements in Hakkâri Province
Historic Assyrian communities in Turkey
Places of the Assyrian genocide